Agh Qeshlaq (also Romanized as Āgh Qeshlāq; also known as Āghcheh Qeshlāq) is a village in Qaflankuh-e Gharbi Rural District, in the Central District of Meyaneh County, East Azerbaijan Province, Iran. At the 2006 census, its population was 19, in 7 families.

References 

Populated places in Meyaneh County